The Australian Institute of Fitness (AIF) is a privately owned, registered training organisation, and the largest fitness training organisation in Australia. Beginning operations as the Health Studio Attendants course in Perth in 1979, the Institute became Australia's first national fitness training provider in 2000, with the merger of five state-based fitness training programs.

History
In 1979, sports educator and author Nigel Champion began running a Health Studio Attendants course in Perth, the first of its kind in Australia.  In 1981, Champion partnered with Australian academic Dr Garry Egger to establish the ACHPER Fitness Leader group of courses in Sydney; before joining, in 1986, with fitness entrepreneur Greg Hurst to establish the Australian Fitness Network. In 2000, Hurst & Champion together with Russell Creagh, Monty Dortkamp, Dr Grant Pavia and Kerry McEvoy, merged five existing fitness training programs – ACHPER Fitness Leader; Australian Fitness Network; Institute for Fitness Professionals; National College of Fitness; and the Australian Institute of Fitness – to create the national Australian Institute of Fitness (AIF).

Russell Creagh served as the first CEO of the consolidated AIF, from 2001 to 2006, followed by Greg Hurst (2006–2011) and Dyanne Ward (2011–2016).  In December 2016, Steve Pettit, then CEO of AIF Queensland, was appointed as its National Chief Executive on the retirement of Dyanne Ward.

Since its inception, the founding entities provided a variety of fitness industry-specific certification and training courses.  Following the Federal Government's 1996 training reform agenda, these courses were incorporated into the Australian Qualifications Framework (AQF). Since 1996, AIF has delivered nationally recognised qualifications in fitness, massage and business, in compliance with the regulatory standards of the AQF.

Company overview

Board of Directors
 Nigel Champion – Director [2001–present]
 Russell Creagh – Director [2001–present]
 Annette Chatterton – Director [2009–present]
 Greg Hurst – Director and Chairman [2005–present]
 Kym Weir – Chairman [2006–2016]
 Steve Pettit – Chief Executive Officer [2016–present]

Ambassadors
 Michelle Bridges [2009 – 2017]
 Hayden Quinn [2015 – 2017]

Campuses
New South Wales
 Parramatta
Newcastle
Sydney CBD

Queensland
 Brisbane

South Australia
 Adelaide

Western Australia
 Perth

Victoria
 South Melbourne
Chadstone
Bundoora

Courses and subjects
AIF is an Australian Registered Training Organisation (RTO) delivering vocational education and training (VET) courses at Certificate III, Certificate IV and Diploma level.  Auditing and registration of Australian RTOs is managed by the Australian Skills Quality Authority (ASQA), as such AIF's programs must meet guidelines set out by State and Federal Governments and associated training bodies.

Registered training organisation
Australian Institute of Fitness (RTO ID 121508) is approved to deliver the following qualifications under the Australian Qualifications Framework:
 Certificate III in Fitness (SIS30315)
 Certificate IV in Fitness (SIS40215)
 Certificate IV in Massage Therapy (HLT42015)
 Diploma of Remedial Massage (HLT52015)

Programs and Courses offered
 Master Trainer Program™ (Certificate IV in Fitness SIS40215)
 Fitness Coach (Certificate III in Fitness SIS30315)
 Remedial Massage Therapist (Diploma of Remedial Massage HLT52015)
 Massage Therapist (Certificate IV in Massage Therapy HLT42015)
 Nutrition Coach
 Fitness Business Essentials

Monty Dortkamp Scholarships
The Monty Dortkamp Scholarship Program awards one scholarship annually covering the tuition costs of a Master Trainer Program™ certification. The scholarship was established by AIF in memory of Monty Dortkamp, to assist people from disadvantaged backgrounds and communities.

Awards and recognition

Notable students and graduates
 Michelle Bridges – Australian personal trainer, author and TV personality
 Libby Babet – Trainer on The Biggest Loser (Australian TV series)
 Laura Dundovic – Model and social media influencer
 Kayla Itsines – Founder of the Bikini Body Guide and social media influencer
 Hayden Quinn – 2012 Cleo Bachelor of the Year, 2011 MasterChef Australia contestant, and co -owner of The Cube Gym
 Emily Seebohm – Three-time Australian Olympian
 Jayde Taylor – Australian Olympian and Hockeyroo
 Libby Trickett – Three-time Australian Olympic gold medalist
 Brittany Elmslie – Represented Australia at the 2012 Summer Olympics in swimming.
 Leisel Jones – Gold, silver and bronze medalist in Swimming at the 2000, 2004, 2008 and 2012 Olympic Games.
 Matt Hodgson – Australian professional rugby union player for the Wallabies and Super Rugby team the Western Force.
 Tim Robards – 2013 ‘Bachelor’ and founder of ‘The Robards Method’

Industry Awards
Finalist 2015 NSW Training Awards – Large Training Provider of the Year

See also

Australian Fitness & Health Expo
Australian Institute of Personal Trainers

References

External links

 The Fitness Leaders Handbook, by Nigel Champion, Garry Egger,  Allan Bolton.

Australian vocational education and training providers
1979 establishments in Australia
Organizations established in 1979
Exercise organizations